PHS may refer to:

Organizations
 Partido Humanista da Solidariedade (Humanist Party of Solidarity), a Brazilian political party
 Peninsula Humane Society, for animal welfare in San Mateo County, California, US
 Pennsylvania Horticultural Society

Schools
 Portland High School (disambiguation)
 Portola High School, Irvine, California, US
Princeton High School (New Jersey), US
 Perry High School (Georgia), US

Other uses
 Personal Handy-phone System, an Asian mobile network system
 Phitsanulok Airport, Thailand, IATA code
 Politihøyskolen, the Norwegian Police University College
 Public Health Scotland
 Public Health Service, US